Martin Gassner-Herz (born 16 May 1985) is a German politician for the FDP and since 2021 member of the Bundestag, the federal diet.

Life and politics 

Gassner-Herz was born 1985 in the West German town of Tuttlingen and was elected to the Bundestag in 2021.

References 

Living people
1985 births
People from Tuttlingen
Members of the Bundestag 2021–2025
21st-century German politicians
Free Democratic Party (Germany) politicians